Mystic Ball is a Canadian documentary film, directed by Greg Hamilton and released in 2006. The film profiles the Burmese sport of chinlone.

The film premiered on May 1, 2006, at the Hot Docs Canadian International Documentary Festival, where it received a Special Jury Prize from the Best Canadian Feature Documentary jury. It was later screened at the 2006 Vancouver International Film Festival, where it won the award for Most Popular Canadian Film, and at the 2006 Whistler Film Festival, where it won the Audience Award.

References

External links

2006 films
2006 documentary films
Canadian sports documentary films
2010s English-language films
English-language Canadian films
2010s Canadian films